A subpersonality is, in humanistic psychology,  transpersonal psychology and ego psychology, a personality mode that activates (appears on a temporary basis) to allow a person to cope with certain types of psychosocial situations. Similar to a complex, the mode may include thoughts, feelings, actions, physiology and other elements of human behavior to self-present a particular mode that works to negate particular psychosocial situations. American transpersonal philosopher Ken Wilber and English humanistic psychologist John Rowan suggested that the average person has about a dozen subpersonalities.

Many schools of psychotherapy see subpersonalities as relatively enduring psychological structures or entities that influence how a person feels, perceives, behaves, and sees themselves. John Rowan, who  is particularly known for his work on the nature of a subpersonality, described it as a 'semipermanent and semi-autonomous region of the personality capable of acting as a person'.

Thereby, allegedly subpersonalities are able to perceive consciousness as something separate from themselves, as well as domestic image attached to these elements. Ken Wilber defined subpersonalities as "functional self-presentations that navigate particular psychosocial situations". For example, if a harsh critic responds with judgmental thoughts, anger, superior feelings, critical words, punitive action, and/or tense physiology when confronted with their own and/or others' fallibility, that is a subpersonality of the harsh critic kicking in to cope with the confrontation situation.

Similarity with possible selves
Subpersonalities are functionally similar to possible selves, a concept used in cognitive psychology.

Possible selves are defined as psychological schema that represent multiple versions of the self. These include past and future selves, which together characterise thoughts and feelings, such as remorse, satisfaction, and doubt about the person we may have been previously, as well as hopes and worries about who we may become.

Psychologist David Lester has reviewed the extensive literature on subpersonalities, possible selves, and subself theory.

In psychotherapy
Facilitating the identification and exploration of subpersonalities or possible selves is a strategy by which therapists seek to promote positive cognitive, emotional, and behavioural change in psychotherapy.

Over the history of psychotherapy, many forms of therapy have worked with inner diversity generally, and representations or subpersonalities specifically. 

Early methods include Jungian analysis, psychosynthesis, transactional analysis, and gestalt therapy. These were followed by some forms of hypnotherapy and the inner child work of John Bradshaw and others. Meanwhile, a number of psychotherapists have developed comprehensive techniques to support the active expression of subpersonalities and possible selves. These include British psychotherapist  Paul Newham who pioneered the therapeutic use of expressive arts to explore subpersonalites through costume, mask, drama, and voice. A recent and method is Internal Family Systems therapy (IFS therapy), developed by Richard C. Schwartz. He sees DID alters as on the same continuum as IFS parts (subpersonalities), the only difference being that alters are more polarized and split off from the rest of the internal system.

Therapeutic outcomes
Recent studies have shown that subpersonality integration in the psychosynthesis therapeutic setting can help clients relieve anxiety and rebuild their identities when dealing with culture shock, enhance creativity, and help to awaken personal and spiritual growth in self-identified atheists.

See also

 Inner critic
 Personification
 
 Future self

References

Clinical psychology
Consciousness studies
Dissociative disorders
Analytical psychology
Personality typologies
Philosophy of mind
Transpersonal psychology